Trigonocaryum is a genus of flowering plants belonging to the family Boraginaceae.

Its native range is Caucasus.

Species:
 Trigonocaryum involucratum (Steven) Medw.

References

Boraginaceae
Boraginaceae genera